British Property Federation (BPF) is a not-for-profit membership organisation representing companies involved in property ownership and investment.

The BPF “work[s] with Government and regulatory bodies to help the real estate industry grow and thrive, to the benefit of [its] members and the economy as a whole.”. It comments regularly on proposed Government policies that will impact its members, including topics such as infrastructure, Build-to-Rent development, and REIT legislation.

Its membership comprises a wide range of companies, including real estate companies, institutional investors, fund managers, investment banks, housing associations, and professional firms. The BPF operates in Scotland as the Scottish Property Federation from offices in Edinburgh.

BPF Chief Executive Melanie Leech was appointed in October 2014. David Partridge, Senior Partner, Argent LLP & Chairman, Argent Related is President, and Guy Grainger, Global Head of Sustainability Services & ESG, JLL, is Vice President. Other board members are from prominent property and investment companies.

Objectives

The BPF has three objectives according to its website:

 to improve the legislative, fiscal and regulatory conditions that affect [the real estate] industry
 to help [BPF] members access information, understand policy, and promote best practice
 to raise the profile of the real estate industry.

Governance

The BPF is governed by a Board, composed of four officers – President, Vice President, Junior Vice President and Immediate Past President – as well as the Chief Executive, an Honorary Treasurer, and six other industry professionals.

Members

The BPF currently has around 400 member companies, roughly made up of a third real estate companies, a third professional firms, and a third other organisations such as investment banks and fund managers.

The BPF's policy work is overseen by a range of committees, each one made up of a chairman and between 15 and 30 people from its member companies. It currently has 21 committees involving over 400 direct members in total, as well as 13 working groups and 6 regional forums

Presidents

 1974 - 76 Victor Lucas
 1976 - 77 Sir Richard Thompson
 1977 - 79 David Llewellyn
 1979 - 81 Nigel Mobbs
 1981 - 83 Christopher Benson
 1983 - 84 Dennis Marler
 1984 - 86 Harry Axton
 1986 - 87 John Brown
 1987 - 88 Geoffrey Carter
 1988 - 89 Brian Cann
 1989 - 90 Michael Mallinson
 1990 - 91 Peter Hunt
 1991 - 92 Trevor Osborne
 1992 - 93 John Parry
 1993 - 94 James Tuckey
 1994 - 95 Roger Carey
 1995 - 96 Trevor Moross
 1996 - 97 Lorraine Baldry
 1997 - 98 Stuart Corbyn
 1998 - 99 Gordon Edington
 1999 - 00 Ronald Spinner
 2000 - 01 Christopher Bertram
 2001 - 02 Jeremy Newsum
 2002 - 03 Ian Henderson
 2003 - 04 David Hunter
 2004 - 05 Martin Moore
 2005 - 06 Ian Coull
 2006 - 07 Nicholas Ritblat
 2007 - 08 Ian Marcus
 2008 - 09 Francis Salway
 2009 - 10 Rupert Clarke
 2010 - 11 John Richards
 2011 - 12 Toby Courtauld
 2012 - 13 Chris Grigg
 2013 - 14 David Marks
 2014 - 15  Bill Hughes
 2015 - 16 Chris Taylor
 2016 - 17 David Sleath
 2017 - 18 Paul Brundage
 2018 - 19 Robert Noel
 2019 - 20 Helen Gordon
 2020 -  David Partridge

Directors-General and Chief Executives
 1974 - 80 Sir Eugene Melville
 1980 - 85 Sir Donald Tebbit
 1986 - 93 Sir Peregrine Rhodes
 1993 - 02 William McKee CBE
 2002 - 14 Liz Peace CBE
 2015-       Melanie Leech CBE

References

External links
 Official BPF website
 Official Scottish Property Federation website

Property companies based in London
Real estate in the United Kingdom
British companies established in 1963